Méduse may refer to:

 French ship Méduse
 Méduse (opera)
 Méduse (cooperative)
 Medusa (Greek mythology)

See also 

 Medusa (disambiguation)